McFadden's Flats is a 1927 silent film based on an 1896 play.

Production
McFadden's Flats has held a unique place in the hearts of theatregoers for more than thirty years", said Small in 1926. "But even this story requires changes and elaboration before it can be placed before screen audiences. This is partly  the camera permits a visualisation of situations that could only be suggested on the stage."

In addition the villainy present in the original play was downplayed. Small:
The substitution of many laughs must have made up for the lack of villainy. Newer productions are proving that audiences the world over want to laugh, and that they don't mind if the usual rules of production are overlooked in the finding of those laughs. Successful entertainment of the future will run more and more to humour than sobs, and money will be emended for ideas rather than lavish settings.
Grant Clarke and Jack Wagner wrote three new comedy sequences for the movie which saw its shooting schedule extended from ten days to two weeks.

Release
The film was very popular.

See also
McFadden's Flats (1935 film)

References

External links
 
 
 
 McFadden's Flats at Silent Film Archive

1927 films
1927 comedy films
American black-and-white films
Silent American comedy films
American silent feature films
American films based on plays
Films directed by Richard Wallace
Films produced by Edward Small
First National Pictures films
1920s American films